Darko Asomaning Nicholas (born 2 June 1939) is a Ghanaian politician. He is also an Economist and Farmer. He served as member of the first parliament of the fourth republic of Ghana for the Fanteakwa constituency in the Eastern region of Ghana.

Early life and education 
Darko Asomaning Nicholas was born on June 2, 1939, in the Eastern Region of Ghana. he attended Ealing Technical College where he obtained his Bachelor of Science in economics.

Politics 
Asomaning was elected during the 1992 Ghanaian parliamentary election as member of the first parliament of the fourth republic of Ghana on the ticket of the National Democratic Congress. He lost the seat in 1996 Ghanaian general election to Samuel Ofosu Ampofo of the National Democratic Congress. He won the seat with 21,284 votes which represented 46.90% of the share by defeating Robert Addo-Fening of the New Patriotic Party (NPP) who obtained 14,241 votes which represented 31.40% of the share, Reuben Gordon Ofosu of the National Democratic Congress who obtained 59 votes which represented 0.10%, Akrasi Joseph Romulus of the People's National Convention (PNC) and Beatrice Ayim Yeboah of the Every Ghanaian Living Everywhere (EGLE) who obtained no vote.

Career 
Darko Asomaning Nicholas is a former member of parliament for Fanteakwa from 7 January 1993 to 7 January 1997. He is a political farmer.

Personal life 
He is a Christian.

References 

1939 births
Ghanaian MPs 1993–1997
National Democratic Congress (Ghana) politicians
Ghanaian farmers
Ghanaian economists
Living people
People from Eastern Region (Ghana)
Ghanaian Christians